Pablo Albano and Daniel Orsanic were the defending champions, but did not participate together this year.  Albano did not participate this year.  Orsanic partnered Jaime Oncins, losing in the quarterfinals.

Lucas Arnold Ker and Tomás Carbonell won in the final 6–1, 6–4, against Alberto Berasategui and Francisco Roig.

Seeds

Draw

Draw

External links
 Draw

Doubles